Innisfree may refer to:

Places 
 Innisfree, Alberta, a village in Canada
 Innisfree Garden, a public garden in Millbrook, New York
 Inishfree, two islands off County Donegal
 Inisfree, a fictional Irish village and setting of the film The Quiet Man
 Inisfree, a small uninhabited island in Lough Gill, Ireland

Other uses
 Innisfree (brand), South Korean cosmetics brand
 Innisfree (film), a 1990 Spanish documentary film
 Innisfree House School, southern Bangalore
 Innisfree Ltd, investment group
 Innisfree Bookshop, Meredith, New Hampshire

See also
"Isle of Innisfree", a 1950 song originally featured in The Quiet Man
"Lake Isle of Innisfree", a poem by William Butler Yeats